Panthea grisea is a moth of the family Noctuidae. It is found in Taiwan.

External links
Image

Pantheinae
Moths of Taiwan
Moths described in 1910